The Coptacrinae are a subfamily of Acrididae (originally described by Brunner von Wattenwyl under the synonym: Coptacrae) in the Orthoptera: Caelifera.  Species can be found in Africa and Asia.

Genera 
The Orthoptera Species File lists the following: 
 Apalacris Walker, 1870
 Bocagella Bolívar, 1889 - Africa
 Coptacra Stål, 1873 (type genus) - tropical Asia
 Coptacrella Bolívar, 1902 - India
 Coptacridia Ramme, 1941 - Eastern Himalayas
 Cyphocerastis Karsch, 1891 - equatorial Africa
 Ecphanthacris: E. mirabilis Tinkham, 1940 - eastern China
 Ecphymacris Bi, 1984: E. lofaoshana (Tinkham, 1940) - eastern China
 Epistaurus Bolívar, 1889 - Africa, India, Indo-China
 Eucoptacra Bolívar, 1902 - Africa, India, Indo-China, peninsular Malaysia, Borneo
 Eustaurus: E. tibialus Mahmood & Yousuf, 2000 - Pakistan
 Exochoderes Bolívar, 1882 - Angola
 Hintzia: H. squamiptera Ramme, 1929 - Cameroon
 Pamphagella Bruner, 1910 - Madagascar
 Paracoptacra Karsch, 1896 - equatorial Africa
 Parepistaurus Karsch, 1896 - central & southern Africa
 Physocrobylus Dirsh, 1951 - Tanzania
 Pirithoicus Uvarov, 1940 - India
 Poecilocerastis Ramme, 1929 - central Africa
 Pseudotraulia - monotypic - P, cornuata Laosinchai & Jago, 1980 - China, Thailand
 Rhopaloceracris Tinkham, 1940 - eastern China, Viet Nam
 Ruwenzoracris Rehn, 1914 - equatorial Africa

References

External links 
 
 

 
Acrididae
Caelifera
Orthoptera subfamilies